Nandavara is a village near the town of Bantwal, in Dakshina Kannada, Karnataka, India. It is located around 25 km from Mangalore, on the banks of the Netravati River.

History

Nandavara is an ancient settlement and a political center historically. Nandavara was the capital of the Nanda Dynasty, which ruled the neighboring region for several centuries.

Etymology

The name Nandavara is derived from a combination of two words, nanda and pura. The Nanda kings established their kingdom on the bank of the Netravati River, and built a fort and a palace. The place came to be known as Nandapura, which in course became well-known by the present name of Nandavara.

References 

Cities and towns in Dakshina Kannada district